Elba de Pádua Lima (20 February 1915 – 7 July 1984), best known by the nickname Tim, was a Brazilian footballer and coach.

Tim was born in Rifaina, São Paulo. During his career, which spanned from 1931 to 1951, he played for Brazilian clubs Botafogo-SP, Portuguesa Santista, Fluminense, and Olaria; he won five Rio de Janeiro State Tournaments (1936, 1937, 1938, 1940, 1941). He retired in Colombia with Atlético Junior of Barranquilla. He was also a member of the Brazil national team, at the 1938 FIFA World Cup, playing one match against Czechoslovakia, and at the South American Championship 1942, where he scored one goal.

44 years after participating in the World Cup as a player, Tim was the manager of the Peru national football team at the 1982 World Cup, in what is the longest interval ever between an individual's World Cup participations, and the longest World Cup career overall. Two years after the 1982 World Cup, he died in Rio de Janeiro at the age of 69.
He coached Bangu. In 1968, he was Primera División Argentina champion with San Lorenzo de Almagro.

Honours

Player 
 Fluminense
 Campeonato Carioca (5): 1936, 1937, 1938, 1940, 1941

Manager 
 Fluminense
 Campeonato Carioca (1): 1964
 Taça Guanabara (1): 1966

 Bangu
 International Soccer League (1): 1960

 San Lorenzo
 Argentine Primera División: 1968 Metropolitano

 Vasco da Gama
 Campeonato Carioca (1): 1970

 Coritiba
 Campeonato Paranaense (2): 1971, 1973
 Torneio do Povo (1): 1973

References

External links
 

1915 births
1984 deaths
Footballers from São Paulo (state)
Brazilian footballers
Brazilian expatriate footballers
Brazilian football managers
Brazil international footballers
Expatriate footballers in Colombia
Brazilian expatriate sportspeople in Colombia
Expatriate football managers in Colombia
Expatriate football managers in Argentina
Expatriate football managers in Peru
Brazilian expatriate sportspeople in Argentina
Brazilian expatriate sportspeople in Peru
1938 FIFA World Cup players
1982 FIFA World Cup managers
Categoría Primera A players
Botafogo Futebol Clube (SP) players
Associação Atlética Portuguesa (Santos) players
Fluminense FC players
Nacional Atlético Clube (SP) players
São Paulo FC players
Olaria Atlético Clube players
Atlético Junior footballers
Olaria Atlético Clube managers
Botafogo Futebol Clube (SP) managers
Atlético Junior managers
Bangu Atlético Clube managers
Fluminense FC managers
San Lorenzo de Almagro managers
CR Flamengo managers
CR Vasco da Gama managers
Coritiba Foot Ball Club managers
Botafogo de Futebol e Regatas managers
Santos FC managers
Guarani FC managers
Esporte Clube Vitória managers
Peru national football team managers
Association football forwards
Association football player-managers